Karl Albin Elis "Kalle" Holmberg (born 3 March 1993) is a Swedish professional footballer who plays as a forward for Hamrun Spartans. He was the topscorer during the 2017 Allsvenskan season, which earned him a call-up to the Sweden national team.

Career statistics

Club

International 
Scores and results list Sweden's goal tally first, score column indicates score after each Holmberg goal.

References

External links
  (archive)
 

1993 births
Living people
Sportspeople from Örebro
Association football midfielders
Örebro SK players
Allsvenskan players
Superettan players
Swedish footballers
Sweden youth international footballers
Sweden under-21 international footballers
Sweden international footballers
Rynninge IK players
IFK Norrköping players
Djurgårdens IF Fotboll players